George Parsonage (November 1880 – 22 May 1919) was an English professional footballer, most notable for his time as a half back and player-manager in the Southern League with Brentford. He was banned from football for life by the Football Association in 1909, but later returned to the game.

Club career

Early years 
A half back, Parsonage began his senior career at local First Division club Blackburn Rovers in 1900, after joining from Oswaldtwistle Rovers. He failed to make a league appearance for the club before dropping into the Lancashire Combination to sign for Accrington Stanley in 1901.

Brentford 
Parsonage moved to London to sign for Southern League First Division club Brentford in 1903. He became captain of the club in the 1904–05 season and was a "tower of strength" for five seasons, before departing Griffin Park in 1908. He made 194 appearances and scored 15 goals for the Bees.

Fulham 
Parsonage returned to league football with Second Division club Fulham in 1908. He made 23 appearances and scored three goals during the 1908–09 season.

"The Parsonage Affair" 
While a Fulham player, Parsonage was the subject of transfer interest from Second Division club Chesterfield in 1909. Reportedly not keen on a move to Derbyshire, Parsonage submitted a request for a £50 signing-on fee (equivalent to £ in ), which was £40 higher than the Football League's maximum. Chesterfield reported the request to the Football Association, who banned Parsonage sine die from football. A petition signed by thousands of fans failed to see the ban overturned.

Later career 
Parsonage returned to football with First Division club Oldham Athletic in September 1910. He ended his career with hometown Lancashire Combination Second Division club Darwen, whom he joined in March 1911.

Managerial and coaching career 
Parsonage had a spell as player-manager of Brentford during the 1907–08 season. He later coached at Oldham Athletic.

International career 
Parsonage's form while at Brentford saw him called up for two England trial games. He played for Amateurs versus Professionals on 16 January 1905 and for the South versus the North the following month, but was passed over in favour of Charlie Roberts.

Career statistics

Player

Manager

References

1880 births
1919 deaths
People from Darwen
English footballers
Association football central defenders
Oswaldtwistle Rovers F.C. players
Blackburn Rovers F.C. players
Accrington Stanley F.C. (1891) players
Brentford F.C. players
Fulham F.C. players
Oldham Athletic A.F.C. players
Darwen F.C. players
English Football League players
Southern Football League players
Brentford F.C. managers
Southern Football League managers
Oldham Athletic A.F.C. non-playing staff
English football managers